La vida no vale nada ("Life is Worth Nothing") is a 1955 Mexican film. It was written by Luis Alcoriza and Janet Alcoriza, and directed by Rogelio A. González.

Plot 

The film tells the story of a depressed, drunk and melancholic man, who wanders aimlessly and meets people who give him the opportunity to demonstrate his human value, but in the end he always escapes or gets depressed because of a sorrow he has inside his heart. . But he will try to discover his reason for being in the world, seeing his life in retrospect and thus be able to find his destiny.

Cast 

Pedro Infante as Pablo Galvan.
Domingo Soler as Leandro, Pablo's father.
Wolf Ruvinskis as the "Alligator".
Lilia Prado as Martha.
Rosario Granados as Cruz, a widowed mother of two children.
Magda Guzmán as Silvia, a woman who falls in love with Pablo.
Hortensia Santoveña as Pablo's mother.
Manuel Dondé as Carmelo, Pablo's friend.
Dolores Tinoco as "Mama Irene".
Nacho Contla as Don Pánfilo.
Aurora Ruiz Álvarez as Teo, Cruz's employee considered to be family.
Ramón Valdés as Bus Driver - (uncredited).
José Pardavé as drunken baker - (uncredited).
Leonor Gómez as saleswoman - (uncredited).
Paquito Fernández as Pablo's brother - (uncredited).

External links
 

1955 films
1950s Spanish-language films
Films directed by Rogelio A. González
Mexican drama films
1955 drama films
Mexican black-and-white films
1950s Mexican films